Chrysauge flavelata is a species of snout moth in the genus Chrysauge. It was described by Stoll in 1781, and is known from Suriname, Venezuela and Brazil (Para).

References

Moths described in 1781
Chrysauginae